Mount Diablo is a mountain of the Diablo Range, in Contra Costa County of the eastern San Francisco Bay Area in Northern California. It is south of Clayton and northeast of Danville. Mount Diablo appears from many angles to be a double pyramid and has many subsidiary peaks.

The mountain is within the boundaries of Mount Diablo State Park, which is administered by California State Parks.

Geography

The summit is accessible by foot, bicycle, or motor vehicle.  Road access is via North Gate Road or South Gate Road. Also you can hike in various places in Mount Diablo.

Mount Diablo State Park 

The state park was the first public open space established on or near the peak. These include 38 preserves, such as nearby city open spaces, regional parks, and watersheds, which are buffered in some areas with private lands that have been protected by conservation easements.

The day use fee per vehicle for the park varies according to the entrance: $6 via Macedo Ranch (Alamo) or Mitchell Canyon (Clayton), and $10 via South Gate Rd. (Danville) & North Gate Rd. (Walnut Creek) leading up Mount Diablo. -->

Viewshed

On a clear day, the Sierra Nevada range is plainly visible from the summit. The best views are after a winter storm; a snowy Sierra shows up better, and summer days are likely to be hazy. Sentinel Dome in Yosemite National Park is visible, but Half Dome is hidden by the 8000-foot ridge at 37.755N 119.6657W. Eight bridges are visible, from left to right (southwest to northeast): San Mateo, Bay, Golden Gate, San Rafael, Carquinez, Benicia, Antioch, and Rio Vista.

Claims that the mountain's viewshed is the largest in the worldor second largest after Mount Kilimanjaroare ill-founded. It does boast one of the largest viewsheds in the Western United States and played a key role in California history.

Countless peaks in the state are taller, but Mount Diablo has a remarkable visual prominence for a mountain of such low elevation. Its looming presence over much of the Bay Area, delta, and Central Valley, and good visibility even from the Mother Lode, all key regions during the gold rush and early statehood, made it an important landmark for mapping and navigation.  The summit is used as the reference datum for land surveying in much of northern California and Nevada.

Cultural history

Mount Diablo is sacred to many California Native American peoples. According to Miwok mythology and Ohlone mythology, it was the point of creation. The local peoples of the area traditionally had a variety of creation narratives associated with the mountain. In one surviving narrative fragment, Mount Diablo and Reed's Peak (Mount Tamalpais) were surrounded by water; from these two islands the creator Coyote and his assistant Eagle-man made Native American people and the world. In another, Molok the Condor brought forth his grandson Wek-Wek the Falcon Hero, from within the mountain.

Earliest names

About 25 independent tribal groups with well-defined territories lived in the East Bay countryside surrounding the mountain. Their members spoke dialects of three distinct languages: Ohlone, Bay Miwok, and Northern Valley Yokuts. The Chochenyo-speaking Ohlone from Mission San Jose and the East Bay area, called the mountain , meaning "at the dawn of time". Further inland, the Nisenan of the Sacramento Valley called it , "dog mountain"; because, as Nisenan elder Dalbert Castro once explained, it's "the place where dogs came from in trade".

According to Indian historian Bev Ortiz and Save Mount Diablo: "The name  was made up in 1866 — with no real Native American connection — referred to the California Legislature's Committee on Public Morals, and tabled. It resurfaced as a real estate gimmick in 1916 with a supposed new translation, "Laughing Mountain", attributed without documentation to Diablo area Volvon Indians.

Most of Mount Diablo, including its peak, was within the homeland of the early Volvon (sometimes spelled Wolwon, Bolbon or Bolgon), a Bay Miwok–speaking tribe. This name persisted for awhile but was replaced in 1850 by the Americans.

Current name

The conventional view is that the peak derives its name from the reaction of Spanish soldiers to the 1805 escape of several Chupcan Native Americans in a willow thicket some 7 miles north of the mountain.  One story tells that their nighttime escape through the thicket was aided by mysterious lights. An 1850 report by General Mariano G. Vallejo tells of a strange dancing spirit turning the battle in favor of the Chupcan. Vallejo interpreted the natives' word for the personage, to mean "devil" in the Anglo-American language.  Vallejo's report could be interpreted to align with Edward G. Gudde's history of place names. (Kyle, and Ortiz)

By 1824, the region north of the mountain came to be known as Monte del Diablo ("devil's thicket"; in this case monte should be translated as thicket or dense woods). It was shown on maps near present-day Concord (formerly known as Pacheco). Later, U.S. settlers understood "Monte" to refer directly to the mountain, and it was recorded with varying degrees of certainty until "Mount Diablo" became official in 1850.

In May 1862, California Geological Survey field director William H. Brewer named the northeast peak of Mount Diablo "Mount King," after Rev. Thomas Starr King, a Unitarian clergyman, abolitionist, Republican, Yosemite advocate, cultural Unionist, and California's leading intellectual. Today it is known simply as North Peak.

Mount Diablo  

In 2005 Arthur Mijares, from the neighboring town of Oakley, petitioned the federal government to change the name of the mountain, claiming it offended his Christian beliefs.  Additionally, he claimed that Diablo is a living person, and so is banned under federal law. He suggested renaming the mountain Mount Kawukum, and later, Mount Yahweh. Suggestions by other individuals included Mount Miwok and Mount Ohlone, after local Indian tribes.  Finally Mijares proposed Mount Reagan, but the board rejected it on the grounds that a person must be deceased for five years to have a geographic landmark named after them. Eventually, the U.S. Board on Geographic Names rejected the petitions, saying there was no compelling reason to change the name.

In 2009 Mijares again proposed the name Mount Reagan to the United States Board of Geographic Names because the late president was by then eligible. The board gave the Contra Costa County Supervisor's Committee until March 31 to file an opinion.  Individual members of the committee have responded that although they respect Reagan, Mount Reagan is not an appropriate name for the historic mountain. Later, the board unanimously voted against renaming the mountain, citing its historical significance.

Early uses

In 1851 the south peak of the mountain was selected by Colonel Leander Ransom as the initial point—where the Mount Diablo Base and Mount Diablo Meridian lines intersect—for cadastral surveys of a large area.  Subsequent surveys in much of California, Nevada and Oregon were located with reference to this point.

Toll roads up the mountain were created in 1874 by Joseph Seavey Hall and William Camron (sometimes "Cameron"); Hall's Mount Diablo Summit Road was officially opened on May 2, 1874.  Camron's "Green Valley" road opened later.  Hall also built the 16-room Mountain House Hotel near the junction of the two roads, a mile below the summit (2,500 foot elevation. (It operated through the 1880s, was abandoned in 1895, and burned c. 1901). As far north as Meridian Road, on the outskirts of Chico, California, the summit was used as a reference point. The road is colinear with the summit, and is named for the meridian which intersects it.

An aerial navigation beacon, the Standard Diablo tower, was erected by Standard Oil at the summit in 1928.  The 10-million-candlepower beacon became known as the "Eye of Diablo" and was visible for a hundred miles.

Protection of the area

After initial legislation in 1921, the state of California acquired enough land in 1931 to create a small state park around the peak. Many improvements were carried out in the 1930s by the Civilian Conservation Corps, but park expansion slowed in the 1940s through the 1960s.

Significantly, botanist Mary Leolin Bowerman (1908–2005), founder of the Save Mount Diablo non-profit in 1971, published her Ph.D. dissertation in 1936 at the University of California, Berkeley. In 1944 she published her book, The Flowering Plants and Ferns of Mount Diablo, California. Her study boundaries became the basis for the state park's first map and for the park's eventual expansion. Her work also became the origin of many of the park's place names.

Mount Diablo was used for broadcasting purposes in the 1950s by radio station KSBR-FM and television station KOVR (channel 13). The Mount Diablo site gave KOVR, which was based in Stockton, regional coverage that also included San Francisco and Sacramento. However, it also forced the station to pay San Francisco rates for movies and impeded any attempt at obtaining network affiliation. In 1957, the station relocated to Butte Mountain in Jackson in order to become an ABC affiliate and remove its signal from the Bay Area.

This state park has been greatly expanded over the decades. Soon after Earth Day in 1971, the nonprofit organization "Save Mount Diablo" was created by co-founders Mary Bowerman and Art Bonwell, barely ahead of real estate developers. At the time, the state park included just  and was the only park in the vicinity of the mountain. According to Save Mount Diablo, there are 50 individual preserves on and around Mount Diablo, some of which are conservation easements covering a single parcel, others are expected to eventually be absorbed into larger nearby parks. As of December 2007, the organization recognizes 38 specific Diablo parks and preserves.

The State Park adjoins park lands of the East Bay Regional Park District, including Morgan Territory Regional Preserve, Brushy Peak Regional Preserve, Vasco Caves Regional Preserve, and Round Valley Regional Preserve. It also adjoins protected areas owned or controlled by local cities such as the Borges Ranch Historic Farm, the Concord Naval Weapons Station (now in the process of being converted to non military use), Indian Valley, Shell Ridge Open Space and Lime Ridge Open Spaces near city of Walnut Creek, and east to the Los Vaqueros Reservoir watershed. The new Marsh Creek State Park and Black Diamond Mines Regional Preserve are among the open spaces stretching to the north. In this way the open spaces controlled by cities, the East Bay Regional Park District, Mount Diablo State Park, and various regional preserves now adjoin and protect much of the elevated regions of the mountain. There are unprotected areas in Arroyo del Cerro, Curry Canyon, the Marsh creek region, and on the northern slopes of North Peak, and in a number of inholdings surrounded by preserve land.

Park expansion continues on all sides of the mountain although its western boundaries are largely complete. Extensive development continues in the southwestern foothills and Tassajara region, such as the upscale development of Blackhawk and individual estates overlooking the Livermore Valley on Morgan Territory Road. Other large projects are proposed in the northern Black Diamond Mines and Los Medanos foothills, at the Concord Naval Weapons Station, and near Cowell Ranch State Park.  Large-scale development of other private parcels is restricted by city and county urban limit lines, by lack of water, excessive slope, and sensitive resources including rare species.  Development of smaller ranchette subdivisions continue to fragment and threaten many parcels and large areas of habitat.

Map of protected lands
Updated acreages and trail mileages were discussed in accompanying press materials and news articles.

Natural history

Geology

The mountain is the result of geologic compression and uplift caused by the movements of the Earth's plates. The mountain lies between converging earthquake faults and continues to grow slowly. While the principal faults in the region are of the strike-slip type, a significant thrust fault (with no surface trace) is found on the mountain's southwest flank. The uplift and subsequent weathering and erosion have exposed ancient oceanic Jurassic and Cretaceous age rocks that now form the summit. The mountain grows from three to five millimeters each year.

The upper portion of the mountain is made up of volcanic and sedimentary deposits of what once was one or more island arcs of the Farallon Plate dating back to the Jurassic and Cretaceous periods, between 90 and 190 million years ago. During this time, the Farallon Plate was subducting beneath the North American continent. These deposits were scraped off the top and accreted onto the North American Plate. This resulted in the highly distorted and fractured basalt and serpentine of the Mount Diablo Ophiolite and metasediments of the Franciscan Complex around the summit. East of the subduction zone, a basin was filling with sediment from the ancestral Sierra further to the east. Up to 60,000 feet (18,000 m) of sandstone, mudstone, and limestone of the Great Valley Sequence were deposited from 66 to 150 million years ago. These deposits are now found faulted against the Ophiolite and Franciscan deposits.

Over the past 20 million years continental deposits have been periodically laid down and subsequently jostled around by the newly formed San Andreas Fault system, forming the Coast Ranges. Within the last four million years, local faulting has resulted in compression, folding, buckling, and erosion, bringing the various formations into their current juxtaposition. This faulting action continues to change the shape of Mount Diablo, along with the rest of the Coast Ranges.

The summit area of Mount Diablo is made up of deposits of gray sandstone, graywacke, chert, oceanic volcanic basalts (greenstone) and a minor amount of shale. The hard red Franciscan chert is sedimentary in origin and rich in microscopic radiolaria fossils. In the western foothills of the mountain there are large deposits of younger sandstone rocks also rich in seashells, severely tilted and in places forming dramatic ridgelines. Mount Diablo forms a double pyramid which gives the appearance of a volcano although in fact it is formed of ancient sea floor rock being uplifted by relatively recent tectonic forces.

Deposits of glassmaking-grade sand and lower-quality coal north of the mountain were mined in the 19th and early 20th centuries, but are now open to visitors as the Black Diamond Mines Regional Preserve. Guided tours of the sand mines and coal field are provided.

Vegetation

The park's vegetation is mixed oak woodland and savannah and open grassland with extensive areas of chaparral and a number of endemic plant species, such as the Mount Diablo manzanita (Arctostaphylos auriculata), Mount Diablo fairy-lantern (Calochortus pulchellus), chaparral bellflower (Campanula exigua), Mount Diablo bird's beak (Cordylanthus nidularius), and Mount Diablo sunflower (Helianthella castanea). The park includes substantial thickets, isolated examples, and mixed ground cover of western poison oak. (It is best to learn the characteristics of this shrub and its toxin before hiking on narrow trails through brush and to be aware that it can be bare of leaves (but toxic to contact) in the winter.)

At higher altitudes and on north slopes is the widely distributed foothill pine (Pinus sabiniana). Knobcone pine (Pinus attenuata) may be found along Knobcone Pine Road in the southern part of the park. The park and nearby Black Diamond Mines Regional Preserve mark the northern extreme of the range of Coulter pine (Pinus coulteri). This species may be seen along the Coulter Pine Trail near the north (Mitchell Canyon) entrance.

In 2005 the endangered species Mount Diablo buckwheat (Eriogonum truncatum), thought to be extinct since last seen in 1936, was rediscovered in a remote area of the mountain.

Wildlife

All vegetation, minerals and wildlife within the park are protected and it is illegal to remove such items or to harass any wildlife.

Commonly seen animals include coyote, bobcat, black-tailed deer, California ground squirrels, fox squirrels and grey foxes; many other mammals including mountain lions are present.  It is a chief remaining refuge for the threatened Alameda whipsnake, California red-legged frog. Less common wildlife species include the reintroduced peregrine falcon, ringtail cats, and to the east American badgers, San Joaquin kit fox, roadrunners, California tiger salamander, and burrowing owls.  There are also exotic (non-native) animals such as the red fox and opossum, the latter being North America's only marsupial.

In September and October male tarantula spiders can be seen (Aphonopelma iodius) as they seek a mate. These spiders are harmless unless severely provoked, and their bite is only as bad as a bee sting. More dangerous are black widow spiders, far less likely to be encountered in the open.

In the wintertime, between November and February, bald eagles and golden eagles are present. These birds are less easily seen than many raptors; golden eagles, particularly, fly at high elevations. Mount Diablo is part of the Altamont Area/Diablo Range, which enjoys the largest concentration of golden eagles anywhere. In recent years there have been credible sightings of California condors, which have been reintroduced at Pinnacles National Park, located to the south in the Gilroy-Hollister area.

Of special note as potential hazards are Northern Pacific rattlesnake. While generally shy and non-threatening, one should be observant and cautious of where one steps to avoid accidentally disturbing one. They are often found warming themselves in the open (as on trails and ledges) on cool, sunny days. Other wildlife to avoid include fleas, ticks and mosquitoes.

There has also been an increase in the mountain lion population in the larger region and one should know how to respond if these animals are encountered. Please see the mountain lion safety tips in the mountain lion article.

Facilities

Entrance stations are located at the end of Northgate Road (in Walnut Creek) and Diablo Road (in Danville).  The Danville entrance is also known as Southgate. If the entrance stations are not operating, park fees may be paid at the junction ranger station, where the two roads join.

From here the road reaches the summit of the mountain, where there is a visitors center housing an observation deck and natural history exhibits. From the elevation of the lower lot the Mary Bowerman Trail is a level wheelchair-accessible path and boardwalk with interpretive stations that extends part way around the mountain; a regular single track trail completes the loop.

Camping facilities are available within the park. There are numerous picnic sites. Pets are restricted and require proper documentation for rabies (not just a tag). Daytime visitors must exit the park by sunset except for special events. Some picnic spots may be reserved but most are available without reservation.

Alcohol is strictly forbidden in the park.  Fires are allowed only during the wet season (generally December through April), and only in sanctioned fire pits. The park may be closed on windy days during the dry season due to extremely hazardous fire conditions.

Two additional entrances with parking for hikers are provided on the northwest side of the park at Mitchell Canyon and Donner Canyon. Mitchell Canyon provides easy access to Black Point and Eagle Peak. Donner Canyon provides hikers access to Eagle Peak, Mount Olympia, North Peak, and the popular Falls Trail, which features several seasonal waterfalls.

Climate

The National Weather Service maintains a weather station at Mount Diablo Junction, 2,170 feet (661 m) above sea level.  The warmest month at the station is July with an average high of 85.2 °F (29.5 °C) and an average low of 59.6 °F (15.3 °C). The coolest month is January with an average high of 55.6 °F (13.1 °C) and an average low of 39.3° (4.1 °C). The highest temperature recorded there was 111 °F (43.9 °C) on July 15, 1972.  The lowest temperature on record was 14 °F (-10 °C) on February 6, 1989, and on December 14, 1990. (The San Francisco Chronicle reported that the temperature dropped to 10 °F (-12.2 °C) at the summit on January 21, 1962.) Temperatures reach 90 °F (32.2 °C) or higher on an average of 36.0 days each year and 100 °F (37.8 °C) or higher on 3.3 days each year. Lows of 32 °F (0 °C) or lower occur on an average of 15.4 days annually.
Annual precipitation averages . The average annual days with measurable precipitation is 65.3 days.

Snowfall at Mount Diablo Junction averages  each year. Measurable snowfall does not occur every year, so the annual average days with measurable snowfall is only .5 days. Snow is more common in the upper reaches of the mountain.

Data-collecting note

The Mt. Diablo Junction weather station is positioned at only about 55 percent of the mountain's height. Temperatures and snow levels are notably different than at the upper reaches of the mountain, where lower temperatures and greater snowfall may have occurred, but simply have not been recorded. Nearby Bay Area mountains, like Mount Hamilton, have their weather stations at or near the summit.

Three conditions are measured at the actual summit, however: wind speed, wind direction and temperature; and are available by an automatic telephone voice response system. Recorded information concerning gate open times, road and pet restrictions, and events is available at another number. These numbers are posted at the park website.

Art and literature

Mount Diablo has inspired many artists and writers. Early work centered on exploration, surveying and was related to the rise and popularization of tourism in the Pacific west. Themes were suggested and heightened by early tourism promoters, the beginnings of the area's preservation and the rise of the environmental movement. The focus was accelerated by artists associated with the University of California, Berkeley, the California College of Arts, the actions of the organizations Save Mount Diablo and the Mount Diablo Interpretive Association, and area art centers, galleries, and museums. In modern times Mount Diablo art has been most strongly represented in plein aire painting, especially the group Artists for Action, and photography.

Representative work includes books and articles by classical writers such as William Brewer, Richard Henry Dana, Jr., Alexandre Dumas, père, Bret Harte, and the Reverend Thomas Starr King, and modern ones such as Mark Allen Cunningham. Poets whose work features the mountain include Philip Lamantia, Andrew Schelling, and Helen Pinkerton.

Early painters include Thomas Almond Ayres, Eugene Camerer, W. H. Dougal, Eduard Hildebrandt, Charles Hittell, Edward Jump, William Keith, John Ross Key, Charles Koppel, Edward Lehman, Pascal Loomis, Henry Miller, Joseph Warren Revere, through Clarkson Dye and others, to modern painters such as Robert Becker, Frank J. Bette, Ruth Breve, Betty Boggess Lathrap, Paul Carey, Bob Chapla, Mary Lou Correia, Ellen Curtis, Pam Della, Susan Dennis, Warren Dreher, John Finger, Pam Glover, JoAnn Hanna, Peg Humphreys, Don Irwin, Jeanne Kapp, Geri Keary, Chris Kent, Paul Kratter, Eunice Kritscher, Fred Martin, Cathy Moloney, Shirley Nootbaar, Charlotte Panton, Greg Piatt, Kenneth Potter, Robin Purcell, Ocean Quigley, Don Reich, Mary Silverwood, Barbara Stanton, Bruce Stangeland, Marty Stanley, and even the recognized comic book painter Dan Brereton.

Photographers include Ansel Adams, Cleet Carlton, Alfred A. Hart, Scott Hein, Stephen Joseph, Don Paulson, Brad Perks, Robert Picker, Richard Rollins, David Sanger, Michael Sewell and Bob Walker.

The mountain has inspired musical artists ranging from the Kronos Quartet to commissioned works by the California Symphony. The pop-punk band The Story So Far, who are from the area, have a song titled Mt. Diablo.

The mountain's name is the source for the "Devils" part of the name of the Blue Devils Drum and Bugle Corps, a 17 time Drum Corps International world champion corps, founded and based in Concord, California since 1957.

David Brevik, head of Blizzard North, got the idea for the name of the Diablo game franchise from Mt. Diablo while living nearby.

In Marvel Comics, the Black Celestial named Tiamut was imprisoned under Mt Diablo for his crimes against the other Celestials. Arishem and the others sealed him away beneath the Diablo Mountain Range in California. See Fantastic Four Vol 1 #339 and #340.

Events

Each Fall the male tarantulas of Mt. Diablo emerge from their burrows to seek mates. The Mt. Diablo Interpretive Association offers guided hikes to observe the migration. The "March of the Tarantulas" can begin as early as August and last through October.

Every year since 1964, the Pearl Harbor survivors and their families have memorialized Pearl Harbor Day by relighting the historic Beacon atop Mount Diablo's summit. A ceremony memorializing the attack on Pearl Harbor on December 7, 1941 is held at the Cal State East Bay Concord Campus, with some of the few remaining survivors who are present. (In 2020, the ceremony was virtual.) This ceremony is made possible due to the support of Mount Diablo State Park, California State University - East Bay: Concord Campus, Save Mount Diablo, CCTV, Vietnam Helicopters Museum, and the Sons and Daughters of Pearl Harbor Survivors.

Under cloudless conditions, more interesting than the sunset itself is the view of the progression of the mountain's shadow across the California Central Valley from the south to the distant Sierra Nevada to the north, finally appearing for a few moments above the horizon as a shadow in the post-sunset sky glow.

In April 1946, an Army C-45 transport plane crashed on the north side of the mountain, killing the pilot and co-pilot.

Save Mount Diablo sponsors many spring and fall schedules of events on the mountain, Spring on Diablo and Autumn on Diablo, as well as many other special events, including its anniversary event, Moonlight on the Mountain; Four Days Diablo, a trip on the Diablo Trail; the Mount Diablo Challenge, an annual hill climb  to the summit with more than 1,100 cyclists each October; and the Mount Diablo Trail Adventure, combined 10k and half-marathon hikes and runs.

The park is popular in winter, when Bay Area residents can enjoy the rare experience of snowfall on the mountain. Snow occurs from the lower reaches of the park all the way to the peak, as was the case in February 2001 and February and March 2006. On Friday, March 10, 2006, an extremely cold storm moved into the region from the Gulf of Alaska, and noticeable amounts of snow fell in all regions of the Bay Area above 500 feet (152 m). The summit of the mountain received around six inches (15 cm) of snow at its peak, and the access roads were closed to automobiles at the 3,000 feet (914 m) mark due to the hazardous icy conditions above.

Occasionally there will be public access to astronomical observations made by a local astronomy club. This club was allocated a small parcel on the mountain and developed a permanent observatory at this location. The observatory has a computer-controlled telescope with a CCD camera.

Mount Diablo Challenge bicycle race

The Mount Diablo Challenge is a bicycle race held annually on the first Sunday in October and benefiting non-profit, Save Mount Diablo's land preservation programs. The race typically draws between 800 and 1,100 riders each year who compete in a mass-start format. Bicycle riders of every age and ability are represented in the field, from weekend enthusiasts to top professionals. Prizes are typically awarded to the top overall male and female finishers, along with several age-specific categories. The most coveted prize is the special "One-Hour" T-shirts, awarded to those who finish the climb in less than one hour.

Course record

The course record for the Mount Diablo climb currently stands at 43 minutes, 33 seconds, set on October 5, 2008, by Nate English (ZteaM) 4 days after breaking his thumb in a bike accident. He broke the 44 minutes, 58 seconds record, set in 2004 by former professional cyclist Greg Drake (Webcor Cycling Team) of Redwood City, California. The previous course record was set by former professional cyclist Mike Engleman (Coors Light Pro Cycling Team) in 1990 with a time of 45 minutes, 20 seconds.

The fastest woman's time recorded at the Mount Diablo climb was set in 2012 by Flavia Oliveira (48 minutes, 13 seconds).  In 2016, Flavia competed at the Olympic Games in Rio de Janeiro where she finished in seventh place.

Outside of the actual Mt Diablo Challenge each October, the climb is one of the more popular uploaded to Strava, with over 11000 attempts recorded as of mid 2014.  The top 10 times listed there are all from the Tour of California, which has used Mt Diablo as a stage several times.  The fastest time (40:49) as of January 2021 is held by professional cyclist Lawson Craddock set in May 2013.

In popular culture 
In Grand Theft Auto: San Andreas a mountain range known as Mount Chiliad was based on Mount Diablo. It reappears in Grand Theft Auto V.

The silhouette of the mountain was used for the cover art of PIHKAL and TIHKAL by Alexander Shulgin.

In the book The Lost Hero by Rick Riordan, Piper McLean's father is captured and help captive on the summit of Mount Diablo by the giant Enceladus.

Diablo (video game) was named after this mountain by David Brevik.

The pop-punk band The Story So Far have a song named after the mountain on their debut record.

Famous residents 

James "Grizzly" Adams was a frequent visitor and resident on Mount Diablo in the mid-1850s.

Robert Walter "Bob" Jones, the first professional baseball player from Contra Costa County, was born in the "Jones House" in Irish Canyon in 1889, a current acquisition project of Save Mount Diablo.

The Mount Diablo Ranch, or Diablo Ranch, was successively owned by Robert Noble Burgess (b. 1878 - d. 1965), who founded the community of Diablo and built the mountain's first auto roads, and millionaire Walter Paul Frick (aka W. P. Frick, b. 1875 - d. 1937), who lived in Diablo and was important in the creation of the State Park in 1931, including sale of six of the first seven parcels for the new park.

Jazz pianist Dave Brubeck grew up on Brubeck Ranch near the park's North Gate entrance.

The area for the  Blackhawk Farm, including the mountain's southern Black Hills, was acquired from Burgess and created by Ansel Mills Easton, the namesake uncle of photographer Ansel Adams. Eventually nearly two-thirds of the farm was added to Mount Diablo State Park.  The remainder was developed as the community of Blackhawk by resident developer Ken Behring and his partner Ken Hofmann.

Legends and folklore

Mount Diablo has long been the site of numerous reports pertaining to cryptozoology, hauntings, mysterious lights, and various other Fortean phenomena (it is rumored that the name "Mount Diablo" is derived from the propensity for such weird events to be alleged at, or in the immediate vicinity of, the mountain).  Phantom black "panthers" are seen with unusual frequency on the slopes of the mountain, as well as at the "Devil's Hole" region of the Las Trampas Regional Wilderness.  As early as 1806, General Mariano Guadalupe Vallejo (July 4, 1807 – January 18, 1890) reported an encounter with a flying, spectral apparition, while engaged in military operations against the Bolgones band of the Bay Miwok tribe.  In 1873, a live frog was said to be found within a slab of limestone at a mine on Mount Diablo.

See also

 Diablo Range
 Diablo, California
 List of highest points in California by county
 List of summits of the San Francisco Bay Area

Notes

References

External links

 
 
 
 Mount Diablo and Mount Diablo 2. Panoramic views from the summit of Mount Diablo. Mediacom.

 
Diablo Range
Mountains of Contra Costa County, California
State parks of California
Parks in Contra Costa County, California
National Natural Landmarks in California
Native American mythology of California
Religious places of the indigenous peoples of North America
California Historical Landmarks
Civilian Conservation Corps in California
Climbs in cycle racing in the United States
Gliding in the United States
Hang gliding sites
Protected areas established in 1931
1931 establishments in California
Landmarks in the San Francisco Bay Area
Mountains of Northern California
Mountains of the San Francisco Bay Area
Parks in the San Francisco Bay Area
Locations in Native American mythology